is a railway station in the city of Tokoname, Aichi, Japan, operated by Meitetsu.

Lines

Station layout
The station has two island platforms connected by a footbridge. The station has automated ticket machines, Manaca automated turnstiles and it is unattended.

Platforms

Adjacent stations

Station history
Nishinokuchi Station was opened on March 29, 1913 as a station on the Aichi Electric Railway Company. The Aichi Electric Railway became part of the Meitetsu group on August 1, 1935. The station was closed in 1944, but was reopened on September 15, 1946. In December 2004, the platforms were extended to be able to handle trains with a length of six carriages. In January 2005, the Tranpass system of magnetic fare cards with automatic turnstiles was implemented.

Passenger statistics
In fiscal 2016, the station was used by an average of 859 passengers daily (boarding passengers only).

Surrounding area
Ōno Castle

See also
 List of Railway Stations in Japan

References

External links

 Official web page 

Railway stations in Japan opened in 1913
Railway stations in Aichi Prefecture
Stations of Nagoya Railroad
Tokoname